The Tait House is a former 18th century residence in the civil parish of Lordelo do Ouro e Massarelos, in the municipality of Porto, in northern Portugal. Today it is a Museum of Numismatics.

History
Throughout the 19th century it had been the formal residence for various and alternate families.

On 22 April 1900, it was acquired by William Tait, a rich merchant connected to the commerce of the wine industry in Porto, but student of flora and fauna, who introduced various plants to Portugal. In 1924, he authored The Birds of Portugal, published in London.

Muriel Tait, who succeeded William Tait, sold the estate to the Câmara Municipal do Porto, with objective of transforming the site into a public greenspace.

The house operates as a nucleus of the Portuense Gabinete de Numismática.

Architecture
The site is located in an isolate position, protected by high walls, overlooking the Douro River, with privileged views of the landscape. From Tait's original interest in horticulture and flora, the Tait Gardens that include the classified Liriodendrum tulipifera, in addition to a rich collections of camellias and roses.

Opposite the building is the Quinta da Macieirinha (that serves as the Romantic Museum of Porto) and the gardens of the Palácio de Cristal (Crystal Palace).

References

Houses in Porto